Gods Lake Narrows Airport  is located adjacent to Gods Lake Narrows, Manitoba, Canada.

Airlines and destinations

See also
Gods Lake Narrows Water Aerodrome

References

External links
Page about this airport on COPA's Places to Fly airport directory

Certified airports in Manitoba

Transport in Northern Manitoba